Island Assembly elections were held in Nevis on 18 December 2017 to elect five members of the Nevis Island Assembly. 

The result was a win for the Concerned Citizens' Movement (CCM), led by Mark Brantley, which won four of the five seats. The opposition Nevis Reformation Party (NRP) won one seat.

Results

By parish

References

Nevis
Nevis
Elections in Saint Kitts and Nevis